Raed Salem (born 16 May 1982) is a Paralympian javelin thrower from Egypt who competes in category F57 events. He won bronze medals at the 2012 Paralympics and 2013 World Championships.

References

Paralympic athletes of Egypt
Athletes (track and field) at the 2012 Summer Paralympics
Paralympic bronze medalists for Egypt
Living people
1982 births
Medalists at the 2012 Summer Paralympics
Egyptian male javelin throwers
Paralympic medalists in athletics (track and field)